Sikora is a surname of Polish language origin. It is related to the Czech and Slovak surname Sýkora. All are derived from a Slavic word for birds of the Paridae (tit) family,  which was used as a nickname for a small, agile person.

People
 Adrian Sikora (born 1980), Polish footballer
 Dariusz Sikora (born 1958), Polish ice hockey player
 Elżbieta Sikora (born 1943), Polish composer
 Éric Sikora (born 1968), French footballer
 Franz Sikora (1863-1902), Austrian explorer
 Jorge Sikora (born 2002), Polish footballer
 Joseph Sikora (born 1976), American actor
 Kacper Sikora (born 1992), Polish singer
 Karol Sikora (born 1948), British oncologist
 Kate Sikora (born 1980), American singer songwriter
 Krzysztof Gustaw Sikora (born 1954), Polish politician—chairperson of the Kuyavian-Pomeranian Regional Assembly
 Krzysztof Ryszard Sikora (born 1959), Polish politician—member of Polish Sejm V Term (2005–2007)
 Megan Sikora (born 1977), American actress
 Mieczysław Sikora (born 1982), Polish footballer
 Rafał Sikora (born 1987), Polish athlete
 Roman Sikora (born 1970), Czech playwright
 Shane Sikora (born 1977), Australian rules footballer
 Tomasz Sikora (born 1973), Polish biathlete
 Victor Sikora (born 1978), Dutch footballer

See also
 
Sikorski (disambiguation)

References

Polish-language surnames